The Mambai (Mambae, Manbae) people are the second largest ethnic group after the Tetum Dili people in East Timor. Originally, they were known as the Maubere by the Portuguese. Maubere or Mau Bere is a widespread male first name among the Mambai people.

Settlement area
The Mambai number about 80,000 from the interior of Dili District to the south coast of the territory, especially in the districts of Ainaro and Manufahi. Its principal centers are Ermera, Aileu, Remexio Administrative Post, Turiscai, Maubisse, Ainaro and Same, East Timor. Among the East Timorese exiles in Australia, the Mambai people are one of the main groups.

Culture
The Mambai language belongs to the Central–Eastern Malayo-Polynesian languages of the Timoric languages branch. It is the second most common mother tongue in East Timor with 195,778 speakers.

Circular houses with conical roofs are typical dwellings, and the Mambai cultivate maize, rice, and root vegetables.

Notable people
Ethnically Mambai politicians include Francisco Xavier do Amaral, Manuel Tilman, Lúcia Lobato, and Fernando de Araújo.

References

Further reading
 Elizabeth Gilbert Traube, Ritual exchange among the Mambai of East Timor: gifts of life and death, Harvard University Press, 1977.
 Elizabeth Gilbert Traube, Cosmology and Social Life: ritual exchange among the Mambai of East Timor, University of Chicago Press, 1986.
 

 
Ethnic groups in East Timor